The 1947 NCAA Golf Championship was the ninth annual NCAA-sanctioned golf tournament to determine the individual and team national champions of men's collegiate golf in the United States.

This year's tournament was held at the University of Michigan Golf Course in Ann Arbor, Michigan.

LSU won the team title, eight strokes ahead of second-place Duke. Coached by T.P. Heard, this was the Tigers' third NCAA team national title. 

The individual championship was won by Dave Barclay, from Michigan.

Team results

Note: Top 10 only
DC = Defending champions

References

NCAA Men's Golf Championship
Golf in Michigan
NCAA Golf Championship
NCAA Golf Championship
NCAA Golf Championship
Sports in Ann Arbor, Michigan